Dyment can refer to:

 Albert Dyment, Canadian politician 
 Clifford Dyment, Welsh poet
 Dave Dyment, Canadian artist
 Dyment, Ontario, Canada
 Dyment Falls, Hamilton, Ontario, Canada
 Dyment Island, Cranton Bay, Antarctica
 R. v. Dyment, a leading Supreme Court of Canada decision on the constitutional right to privacy

See also
 Diamond (disambiguation)
 Diamant (disambiguation)
 Dymond (disambiguation)
 Diament (disambiguation)
 Dimond (disambiguation)